Tamás Koltai  (born 30 April 1987) is a Hungarian football player who plays for Gyirmót FC Győr.

Koltai was born in Győr, and made his debut on 24 May 2008, in Budapest against Greece.

Club statistics

Updated to games played as of 9 December 2017.

References

External links

1987 births
Living people
Sportspeople from Győr
Hungarian footballers
Association football midfielders
Hungary international footballers
Mosonmagyaróvári TE 1904 footballers
Győri ETO FC players
Fehérvár FC players
Paksi FC players
Gyirmót FC Győr players
Nemzeti Bajnokság I players
Nemzeti Bajnokság II players